No Trigger is an American melodic hardcore band from Massachusetts.

History
The band formed in 2001, with a sound which takes cues from like-minded outfits such as Strike Anywhere and None More Black. The band self-released two demos, one of them a split with Wasteland. By this point the band had started to gain accolades from the webzine likes of Pastepunk and Punknews, the latter of which referred to No Trigger as close to being "the best unsigned band in America".

In late 2004, the band compiled these recordings and remastered the sound for their seven track debut release, Extinction in Stereo, released on independent record label Bigmouth Japan. The players were  Tom Ciesluk on bass, Mike Ciprari on drums, Mike Przygoda and John Strada on guitar, Tom Rheault on  vocals.  The engineers were Will Killingsworth and Nick Rotundo.

In 2005, No Trigger signed to independent record label Nitro Records, and their debut full-length, entitled Canyoneer, was released on March 21, 2006.

A long period of inactivity following Canyoneer lead to speculation that No Trigger had broken up. The band released an update in September 2010 which announced that the original lineup had reformed and was going to release Be Honest, a 7-inch EP on December 14, 2010. The band announced that they had signed to No Sleep Records shortly after the release of the EP, and anticipate a full-length release in mid-2011. Their second album, Tycoon, was recorded with producer Jay Maas beginning in July, 2011, and was released in early 2012.  At that time the release of the band members included vocalist Tom Rheault and drummer Mike Ciprari.

Discography

Studio albums 
 Canyoneer (Nitro Records, March 2006)
 Tycoon (No Sleep Records, February 21, 2012)
 Dr. Album (Red Scare, 2022)

Singles and EPs 
 The World Is Not a Stage (CD-R) (self-released, 2003)
 No Trigger / Wasteland (CD-R) (self-released, 2004)
 Extinction in Stereo [compilation] (Bigmouth JPN, 2005, New School Records, 2007)
 Be Honest (Mightier Than Sword Records, 2010)
 Adult Braces (Bird Attack Records, 2017)
 Acid Lord (Red Scare, 2022)

Music videos 
 "Earthtones" (2005)
 "Fish Eye Lens" (2006)
 "More To Offer" (2007)
 "Tooth" (2011)
 "Dried Piss" (2012)
 "Checkmate" (2013)
 "Dogs On Acid" (2017)

Members

Current
 Tom Rheault – lead vocals
 Brad Rheault – bass guitar
 Jon Strader – rhythm guitar
 Mike Przygoda – lead guitar
 Jono Diener – drums
 Tom Ciesluk – guitar / keys

Former
 Billy Bean – guitar
 Erik Perkins – drums
 Solomos – Roadie Extrodinaire
 Mike Ciprari – drums

References

External links
Official No Trigger MySpace Page
Exclusive Interview with No Trigger @ Punkshit.org
Nitro Records
New School Records
No Trigger @ Punknews.org

Hardcore punk groups from Massachusetts
No Sleep Records artists
Nitro Records artists